The Nascentes Geraizeiras Sustainable Development Reserve ( is a sustainable development reserve in the Cerrado ecoregion within the state of Minas Gerais, Brazil.

Location
The Nascentes Geraizeiras Sustainable Development Reserve (RDS), in the north of the state of Minas Gerais.

It protects parts of the municipalities of: 
Montezuma (54.72%)
Rio Pardo de Minas (28.8%) 
Vargem Grande do Rio Pardo (16.47%) .

History
The Nascentes Geraizeiras Sustainable Development Reserve (RDS) was created in response to demands from the Movimento dos Geraizeiros, which represents the traditional community of the state. This includes small-scale producers of cassava flour, brown sugar, corn and beans, and harvesters of the pequi and panã fruits and of medicinal plants of the cerrado.
The RDS was created by presidential decree on 13 October 2014.

The Nascentes Geraizeiras RDS is administered by the Chico Mendes Institute for Biodiversity Conservation (ICMBio).
The reserve is classed as IUCN protected area category VI (protected area with sustainable use of natural resources).
The purpose is to protect the water sources in the reserve, protect areas used for extraction by the traditional communities, give the traditional communities access to the reserve and promote their social and economic development, encourage studies on conservation and sustainable use of the cerrado and promote conservation of biodiversity.

Notes

Sources

Sustainable development reserves of Brazil
Protected areas of Minas Gerais
Cerrado
Protected areas established in 2014
2014 establishments in Brazil